The Queen's Cup, formerly King's Cup, is a horse race run in different locations across Australia from 1927 in most years until the present day. It was originally held in each of the six states of Australia in rotation each year, but has not been held in strict rotation in recent decades. , the most recent race was run in March 2022 at Rosehill Gardens Racecourse in Sydney.

History
The King's Cup was first run in 1927, inaugurated by the King of the United Kingdom and Dominions, King George V, to celebrate the visit to Australia of the then Duke and Duchess of York (later George VI and Queen Elizabeth, the Queen Mother). The king would provide the trophy each year. The conditions of the race stated that the race should be run in a different state in rotation each year, and hosted by that state's jockey club. The rotation was to be hosted in this order: Victoria, New South Wales, Queensland, South Australia, Western Australia, and Tasmania, with the first race in Victoria. The participating jockey clubs decided that it should be a weight-for-age race (a Group 1 race). The race was especially prestigious in the years before World War II. 

The inaugural race in 1927 was won by Spear Maiden at Flemington Racecourse in Melbourne. The first trophy was presented by George V's son, then  Duke of York, later King George VI, when he was in Australia to open the first Federal Parliament at Canberra.

In May 1951, Shannon, ridden by Darby Munro won the race at Randwick Racecourse in Sydney. 

On the death of George V, George VI advised that he would continue to provide the trophy for the race. The race lapsed after the death of George VI in February 1952, but in April that year the Australian Jockey Club in Sydney received permission to run a Queen's Cup. Queen Elizabeth II would continue the tradition, providing the trophy, with a prize worth £2000.

The first newly-renamed Queen's Cup was run at Randwick Racecourse, Sydney, as part of the spring carnival, on Saturday 11 October 1952, hosted by the AJC. The race was run over  under quality handicap conditions. In a surprise win, outsider Salamanca, ridden by 19-year-old Aboriginal jockey Merv Maynard, beat the two favourites, champion horses Hydrogen and Dalray, both ridden by experienced jockeys, Keith Nuttal and Darby Munro. Maynard's only regret was that he did not get to meet the then Princess Elizabeth, later Queen Elizabeth II, who was, with husband Prince Philip, Duke of Edinburgh, scheduled to hand out the trophies at the event. However, en route to their Australian engagements, the couple were visiting several African countries, and it was there that they received the news of the death of her father, George VI, so they had to return to England.
The young princess would remember the win, however, and on a state visit forty years later asked to be introduced to Maynard.

In August 1953, Euphrates beat Hydrogen and set a Queensland race record, at Eagle Farm Racecourse, Brisbane

In March 1954: Sir Coral, at Morphettville Racecourse, Adelaide, won the race in the presence of the Queen and Prince Philip, Duke of Edinburgh.

It continued to be run in rotation until around 1985, when it appears to have been run at Randwick in that year and then again in 1988. It was run at Morphettville Racecourse in Adelaide, South Australia, until 1990, when it was run at Cheltenham Park Racecourse (described as "a new race in Adelaide called the Queen's Cup" by The Canberra Times), where it was also referred to as the SAJC Queen's Cup.

The winning horse was Aquidity, trained by Tommy Smith, and Queen Elizabeth, who presented the trophies, and the Duke of Edinburgh were in attendance{

It was again referred to as a Group 3 race.

Since 2000 the race has continued to be run in rotating venues, but not held in 2009 or 2014, and with breaks in 2020 and 2021 owing to the COVID-19 pandemic in Australia. In 2022 it was held by the Australian Turf Club on 19 March at Rosehill Gardens Racecourse in western Sydney, entitled "Queen's Cup (N E Manion Cup)".

1934 & 1954 racebooks

Selected dates and winners

King's Cup

1927: Spear Maiden 
1928: Limerick
1929: Valparaiso
1930: Phar Lap
1933: Kuvera
1932: Second Wind
1934: Rogilla
1946: Shannon
1951: Durham, at Flemington

Queen's Cup

1952: Salamanca  

1953: Euphrates beat Hydrogen

1954: Sir Coral, at Morphettville Racecourse, Adelaide
 
1955: Priandy, at Perth, WA

1956: Dunsinane, at Launceston Racecourse, Tasmania

1957: Sir William, at Flemington, Melbourne

1958: McDougall, at Randwick, Sydney

1984: Colonial Flag, at Morphettville, Adelaide

1985: Chelaware, at Randwick

1988: Natski, at Randwick

1989: Miss Remus, at Eagle Farm Racecourse, Brisbane

1990: Raslaan,

1992: Aquidity, at Randwick

1993: Toll Bell, at Flemington

1995: Full Suit, at Eagle Farm, Brisbane

1996: Navajo Flash / Slygo Connection, at Morphettville
2000: Yippyio
2001: Gillespie, at Eagle Farm, Brisbane
2003: Bellton, at Cheltenham Park, Adelaide 
2004: Dundally, at Belmont Park Racecourse, Perth
2005: Midnight Escapade,  at Launceston
2006: Demerger
2007: Ice Chariot
2008: Tayllaroo, at Cheltenham Park, Adelaide
2010: Gondorff
2011: Syreon
2012: Spechenka
2013: Motivado
2015: Real Love
2015/6: Dandino
2016/7: Allergic, at  Rosehill Gardens Racecourse, Sydney
2017/8: Plot Twist, at Sunshine Coast, Queensland
2018/9: Valac, at Morphettville, Adelaide
2021/2: No Compromise, at Rosehill Gardens, Sydney

References 

Horse races in Australia
1927 establishments in Australia